The Port Saint-Sauveur is one of the two river ports located in Toulouse on the Canal du Midi. The other being the Port de l'Embouchure.

References

External links

Map
Flicr Photo 1
Photo 2

Canal du Midi
Ports and harbours of France
Buildings and structures in Toulouse
Transport in Toulouse